Tula Luz Benites Vásquez is a Peruvian politician and a Congresswoman representing La Libertad for the 2006–2011 term. Benites belongs to the Peruvian Aprista Party.

External links
Official Congressional Site

Living people
American Popular Revolutionary Alliance politicians
Members of the Congress of the Republic of Peru
21st-century Peruvian women politicians
21st-century Peruvian politicians
Year of birth missing (living people)
Place of birth missing (living people)
Women members of the Congress of the Republic of Peru